Margala (Margalu) is a rural locality (a settlement) in Ust-Koksinsky District, the Altai Republic, Russia. The population was 122 as of 2016. There are 4 streets.

Geography 
Margala is located 33 km southeast of Ust-Koksa (the district's administrative centre) by road. Chendek is the nearest rural locality.

References 

Rural localities in Ust-Koksinsky District